Parliamentary elections were held in Syria on 9 October 1953. They were the elections held under the 1953 constitution, which granted universal suffrage to women, scrapping the educational requirements used in previous elections.

The result was a victory for the Arab Liberation Movement, which won 72 of the 82 seats. The People's Party and the National Party were both closed down and prohibited from operating. Most of their leaders were imprisoned or under house arrest due to President Adib al-Shishakli's tyrannical regime that came to power after a coup d'état 3 years earlier.

Results

References

Syria
1953 in Syria
Parliamentary elections in Syria
Election and referendum articles with incomplete results